Keiki Nishiyama (西山 慶樹 Nishiyama Keiki, born 19 October 1988) is a Japanese volleyball player who plays for JT Marvelous.

Profile
She became a volleyball player at 10 years old.
Her elder sister is Yuki Nishiyama.

Clubs
 Kyoto Tachibana High School
 JT Marvelous (2007-)

Awards

Team 
2009-2010 V.Premier League -  Runner-Up, with JT Marvelous.
2010 59th Kurowashiki All Japan Volleyball Tournament -  Runner-Up, with JT Marvelous.
2010-11 V.Premier League -  Champion, with JT Marvelous.
2011 60th Kurowashiki All Japan Volleyball Tournament -  Champion, with JT Marvelous.

National team

Senior team 
 2008 - 1st AVC Women's Cup

Junior team 
2006 Asian junior volleyball competition
2007 World junior volleyball competition

References

External links
JVA Biography
JT Official Website

1988 births
Living people
Sportspeople from Kyoto
Japanese women's volleyball players
JT Marvelous players